The 1888–89 season was Preston North End's first season in the Football League, which had just been founded. Because of this Preston became one of the founder members of the Football League. Preston were very successful during the season as they went on to claim the league and cup double without being defeated.

Final league table

Results
Preston's score comes first

Legend

Football League

FA Cup

Appearances

See also
1888–89 in English football
List of Preston North End F.C. seasons

References
General
 Preston North End 1888–89

Specific

Preston North End F.C. seasons
Preston
English football championship-winning seasons